Katsunosuke (written:  or ) is a masculine Japanese given name. Notable people with the name include:

, Japanese voice actor and actor
, Japanese diplomat

Japanese masculine given names